Kiashahr (also Romanized as Kīāshahr and Kīyā Shahr; also known as Bandar-e Kīāshahr and Bandar-e-Kīyā Shahr; formerly, Bandar-e Faraḩnāz) is a city and capital of Kiashahr District, in Astaneh-ye Ashrafiyeh County, Gilan Province, Iran.  At the 2006 census, its population was 13,762, in 4,069 families.

Kiashahr port is a beautiful green city in the north of Iran. The Sefidrud river is the biggest of river in northern Iran, which flows into the Caspian Sea through Kiashahr beach. There is the Bojagh lagoon in Kiashar; it is the environment of many migratory birds. Fishery and agriculture are the main occupations in Kiashahr. The rice of Kiashahr is some of the best in Iran.

There is a wooden bridge that connects the city to the beach through the Bojagh lagoon.  In Kiashahr there is a bazaar (Chahar Shanbeh Bazaar) on Wednesdays and people of all occupations sell their products.  The fishery in Kiashahr is very old, and was used by Russia in 1885 when they came to Iran to fish for caviar.

References

External links 

http://www.trekearth.com/trip.php?tid=1146 Travelogue on Rasht, Zibakenar & Kiashahr

Populated places in Astaneh-ye Ashrafiyeh County
Cities in Gilan Province